Hampsterdance: The Album (also referred to as The Hampsterdance Album) is the debut album by Hampton the Hampster, released on October 24, 2000, through Koch Records. It was produced by the Canadian producer team the Boomtang Boys after the success of the novelty track "The Hampsterdance Song" featuring the hamster character Hampton, which was created by Canadian art student Deidre LaCarte as an Internet meme in 1998. The album reached the top 10 of the charts in Australia, where it was certified gold by ARIA. It produced the additional singles "Thank God I'm a Country Boy" (a cover of the John Denver track), "Hampster Party" and "Hampsterdance Christmas" (which included the tracks "Jingle Bells" and "Deck the Halls"), the former two of which charted at numbers 12 and 44 in Australia, respectively.

Critical reception

Reviewing the album for AllMusic, MacKenzie Wilson described it as "a fun-spirited collection of children's rock tunes" with "tones [that] are vibrant, equally enjoyable for any youngster" that "plays into club-dance and R&B elements for some hooky singalongs". Wilson highlighted the cover of Sly and the Family Stone's "Dance to the Music" for its "classic samples".

Track listing

Personnel
 The Boomtang Boys – producers, executive producers
 Nick Rawson – mastering (at The Other Studio)
 Jeff Chenault – art direction and design

Charts

Certifications

References

2000 debut albums
Children's music albums by Canadian artists
Novelty albums